José Antonio Marí Alcaraz-Garcia (born 23 October 1988) is a swimmer from Spain.

Personal 
Mari was born in Valencia. He has a mild physical disability. In 2012, he lived in San Cugat del Vallés, Barcelona.

Swimming 
Mari is an S10 classification swimmer. He is affiliated with theanish Federation of Sports for the Physically Disabled (FEDDF).

Mari competed at the 2008 Summer Paralympics. In 2010, he competed at the Tenerife International Open. He competed at the 2010 Adapted Swimming World Championship in the Netherlands, where he won three silver medals.  In advance of the competition,  he attended a swimming camp with the national team that was part of the Paralympic High Performance Program (HARP Program). He competed at the 2011 IPC European Swimming Championships in Berlin, Germany, where he finished first and set a European record in the 100m freestyle.

In 2012, Mari competed at the Paralympic Swimming Championship of Spain by Autonomous Communities. From the Catalan region of Spain, he was a recipient of a 2012 Plan ADO scholarship. He competed at the 2012 Summer Paralympics, and earned a bronze in the 50 meter S10 freestyle race. He competed at the 2013 IPC Swimming World Championships.

In 2018, he competed in the men's 100 metre freestyle S10 event at the 2018 Mediterranean Games held in Tarragona, Spain.

References

External links 
 
 

1988 births
Living people
Spanish male breaststroke swimmers
Spanish male freestyle swimmers
Paralympic swimmers of Spain
S9-classified Paralympic swimmers
Paralympic bronze medalists for Spain
Swimmers at the 2008 Summer Paralympics
Swimmers at the 2012 Summer Paralympics
Medalists at the 2012 Summer Paralympics
Medalists at the World Para Swimming Championships
Medalists at the World Para Swimming European Championships
Mediterranean Games medalists in swimming
Mediterranean Games silver medalists for Spain
Swimmers at the 2009 Mediterranean Games
Swimmers at the 2018 Mediterranean Games
Paralympic medalists in swimming
Swimmers at the 2020 Summer Paralympics